Słone (meaning "salty") may refer to the following places in Poland:
Słone, Lower Silesian Voivodeship (south-west Poland)
Słone, Kuyavian-Pomeranian Voivodeship (north-central Poland)
Słone, Lubusz Voivodeship (west Poland)
Słone (Kudowa-Zdrój), Silesia